The 1927–28 Cincinnati Bearcats men's basketball team represented the University of Cincinnati during the 1927–28 NCAA men's basketball season. The head coach was Boyd Chambers, coaching his tenth season with the Bearcats. The team finished with an overall record of 14–4.

Schedule

|-

References

Cincinnati Bearcats men's basketball seasons
Cincinnati
Cincinnati Bearcats men's basketball team
Cincinnati Bearcats men's basketball team